Record of Youth (Hangul: 청춘기록, Hanja: 青春紀錄, RR: Cheongchun-girok) is a South Korean television series starring Park Bo-gum, Park So-dam, Byeon Woo-seok, and Kwon Soo-hyun. It aired on tvN from September 7 to October 27, 2020, every Monday and Tuesday at 21:00 (KST), and is available for streaming worldwide on Netflix.

Synopsis
The drama follows the lives of three young people in the contemporary fashion industry. They strive to achieve their dreams and love without despair.

Cast

Main
 Park Bo-gum as Sa Hye-jun, a model from a working-class family who dreams of becoming a top actor. Despite failing several auditions, he postpones his military enlistment and eventually begins to make his dreams come true.
 Im Jae-ha as young Sa Hye-jun
 Park So-dam as Ahn Jeong-ha, a makeup artist, a fan-girl of Hye-jun as he models, she lives her life positively. After quitting her office job, she works at a beauty salon in Cheongdam-dong where she is often criticized by her boss. Later, she starts her own beauty salon. 
 Byeon Woo-seok as Won Hae-hyo, a model turned actor and one of Hye-jun's best friends. He comes from a rich family where his mother controls his professional life.
 Noh Young-min young Won Hae-hyo
 Kwon Soo-hyun as Kim Jin-woo, bumbling friend of Hye-jun and Hae-hyo. He works as a photographer and wants to open his own studio.
 Baek Soo-min as young Kim Jin-woo

Supporting

Sa Hye-jun's family 
Ha Hee-ra as Han Ae-sook, Sa Hye-jun's mother
Han Jin-hee as Sa Min-gi, Sa Hye-jun's grandfather
Park Soo-young as Sa Young-nam, Sa Hye-jun's father
 Lee Jae-won as Sa Kyeong-jun, Sa Hye-jun's older brother

Won Hae-hyo's family 
Shin Ae-ra as Kim Yi-young, Won Hae-hyo's mother
 Seo Sang-won as Won Tae-kyeong, Won Hae-hyo's father
 Jo Yoo-jung as Won Hae-na, Won Hae-hyo's younger sister

Kim Jin-woo's family 

 Jung Min-sung as Kim Jang-man, Kim Jin-woo's father
 Park Sung-yeon as Lee Kyung-mi, Kim Jin-woo's mother
 Jang Yi-jung as Kim Jin-ri, Kim Jin-woo's younger sister

Others 
 Shin Dong-mi as Lee Min-jae, Sa Hye-jun's manager
 Lee Chang-hoon as Lee Tae-soo, Hye-jun's former manager and the new director at Park Do-ha's entertainment company
 Kwon Eun-soo as Gateway casting interviewer
 Park Se-hyun as Choi Soo-bin, Ahn Jeong-ha's friend and co-worker at the salon
 Yang So-min as hair salon director
 Jo Ji-seung as Park Jin-ju, Ahn Jeong-ha senior co-worker at the salon
 Lim Ki-hong as Yang Moo-jin
 Kim Gun-woo as Park Do-ha, a top actor
 Kim Min-chul as Chi-yeong

Special appearances 
 Kim Hye-yoon as Lee Bo-ra, a makeup artist (Ep. 1)
Lee Seung-joon as Charlie Jung, a fashion designer (Ep. 1–2, 10)
 Lee Hae-woon as PD (Ep. 1, 3)
Seol In-ah as Jung Ji-ah, Hye-jun's ex-girlfriend (Ep.4, 7–15)
 Kim Min-sang as Director Choi Se-hun (Ep. 1, 4–5, 9)
 Kang So-young as Runway model (Ep. 2)
 Bae Yoon-kyung as Kim Su-man (Ep. 8–16)
 Seo Hyun-jin as Lee Hyun-soo, an actress (Ep. 8–9)
 Park Seul-gi as host at a press conference (Ep. 9)
 Park Seo-joon as Song Min-soo, an actor (Ep. 9–10)
 Kang Han-na as Jessica, host of OVN Drama Awards (Ep. 9)
 Lee Sung-kyung as Jin Seo-woo (Ep. 12)
 Lee Hye-ri  as Lee Hae-ji (Ep. 13)
 Choi Soo-jong as Mall visitor (Ep. 14)

Original soundtrack

Part 1

Part 2

Part 3

Part 4

Part 5

Part 6

Part 7

Part 8

Part 9

Part 10

Part 11

Chart performance

Viewership
A 6.362% viewership rating was recorded nationwide for the series first episode, making it one of the highest premiere ratings of the network.

Awards and nominations

References

External links 
  
 Record of Youth at Studio Dragon 
 Record of Youth at Pan Entertainment 
 
 
 

TVN (South Korean TV channel) television dramas
2020 South Korean television series debuts
2020 South Korean television series endings
South Korean romance television series
Television series by Studio Dragon
Television series by Pan Entertainment
Korean-language Netflix exclusive international distribution programming